Bruce Peever (4 September 1931 – 4 May 1998) was an Australian pole vaulter who competed in the 1956 Summer Olympics. He finished seventh in the 1954 British Empire and Commonwealth Games pole vault.

References

1931 births
1998 deaths
Australian male pole vaulters
Commonwealth Games competitors for Australia
Athletes (track and field) at the 1954 British Empire and Commonwealth Games
Olympic athletes of Australia
Athletes (track and field) at the 1956 Summer Olympics
20th-century Australian people